Doris König (born 25 June 1957 in Kiel) is a German judge, jurisprudent and public law scholar  who serves as the Vice President of the Federal Constitutional Court of Germany.

Career 
Between 1975 and 1980, König studied law and at the University of Kiel. In 1982 she completed a Master of Comparative Law program at the University of Miami School of Law.

König started her legal career as a judge at the Landgericht Hamburg (Regional Court of Hamburg). Since 2000, she has been a full professor at Bucerius Law School, Hamburg. From 2012 to 2014 she served as Bucerius Law School's President.

König's research areas include law of the sea, environmental law, international protection of human rights and law of the European integration.

Judge of the Federal Constitutional Court of Germany 
A nominee of the Social Democratic Party of Germany, on 21 May 2014 she was elected by the Bundestag to succeed Gertrude Lübbe-Wolff as sitting judge of the Federal Constitutional Court of Germany in the Court's second senate. She was inaugurated on 2 June 2014.

In February 2020, together with two other judges (Ulrich Maidowski and Christine Langenfeld), she dissented from the decision by the Court, that the ratification of the Agreement on a Unified Patent Court of 19 February 2013 in Germany was null and void.

On 22 June 2020 she succeeded Stephan Harbarth, who was appointed as the President of the Federal Constitutional Court of Germany, as the Court's vice president and also became the chairwoman of its second senate.

References

External links 
 Judge König's website

1957 births
Living people
20th-century German judges
German women judges
German legal scholars
Jurists from Kiel
Justices of the Federal Constitutional Court
21st-century German judges
20th-century women judges
21st-century women judges